Linyola is a municipality in the comarca of Pla d'Urgell in Catalonia, Spain.

Notable individuals associated with Linyola:
Josep Maria Fusté (1941), former FC Barcelona midfielder, was born here.
Bojan Krkić (1990), Vissel Kobe forward (association football), was born here.

References

Further reading

External links

 Government data pages 

Municipalities in Pla d'Urgell